John Rose may refer to:

People

Politicians 
John Rose (fl. 1399), MP for Totnes
John Rose (died 1591), English MP for Canterbury
John B. Rose (1875–1949), New York politician
John A. Rose, Kentucky politician
John Marshall Rose (1856–1923), US Congressman from Pennsylvania
Murray Rose (politician) (John Murray Rose, born 1939), New Zealand politician
Sir John Rose, 1st Baronet (1820–1888), Canadian politician
John Rose (Minnesota politician) (1934–1988), American state representative and former teacher
John Rose (Tennessee politician) (born 1965), U.S. Representative for Tennessee's 6th congressional district, Former Commissioner of Agriculture for the State of Tennessee

Others 
 John Rose (potter), 18th-century founder of Coalport porcelain
 John Rose, founder of Rose Creative Strategies, a subsidiary of Rose Marketing Ltd.
Sir John Rose (businessman) (born 1952), British businessman
John Rose (chemist) (1911–1976), British research chemist with ICI
John Rose (organist), American college organist at Trinity College, Connecticut
John Rose (Oxford) (1925–2004), British founder of Daily Information
John Rose (cricketer) (1853–1920), English cricketer
John Carter Rose (1861–1927), American federal judge
SS John Carter Rose, a Liberty ship
John Holland Rose (1855–1942), British historian
John R. Rose, American cartoonist
John Rose (luthiers), father-and-son luthiers in London during the latter half of the 16th and early 17th centuries
John Rose, name assumed while serving in the American Revolutionary War by Gustave Rosenthal (1753–1829), Baltic-German nobleman

Places
John Rose Minnesota Oval, ice skating rink in Roseville, Minnesota

See also
Jack Rose (disambiguation)
Jon Rose (born 1951), Australian violinist